Baron Imre Ghillány (28 July 1860 – 23 September 1922) was a Hungarian politician, who served as Minister of Agriculture between 1913 and 1917. He was the főispán of Sáros County from 1903 until his resignation in 1905. He became a member of the Diet of Hungary in 1910 as representative of Eperjes. Ghillány was one of the deputy chairmen of the Party of National Work. During the Regency he was one of the first politicians who joined to the Unity Party, which founded by István Bethlen. He was a member of the House of Magnates until his death.

References
 Magyar Életrajzi Lexikon	

1860 births
1922 deaths
Agriculture ministers of Hungary
People from Prešov District
Lord-lieutenants of a county in Hungarian Kingdom